Hakea leucoptera subsp. leucoptera, commonly known as silver needlewood, needlewood, needle bush, needle hakea or kulua, is a shrub or small tree with cylinder-shaped leaves and with flowers which have a covering of white, woolly hairs on the flower stalks. It is found in western New South Wales, north-western Victoria, South Australia and the Northern Territory. It grows in grassland, shrubland and woodland.

Taxonomy and naming
Hakea leucoptera was first formally described in 1810 by Robert Brown and the description was published in Transactions of the Linnean Society of London. In 1996 William Baker described two subspecies of H. leucoptera including this subspecies and subspecies sericipes.

References

leucoptera
Flora of Australia
Plants described in 1810